The Assam Football Association (AFA) is one of the 37 Indian State Football Associations that are affiliated to the All India Football Federation. It governs association football in the state of Assam, India and also oversees the Assam men's and women's football teams. Naba Kumar Doley is in the charge of current president 
and Hemendra Nath Brahma is the secretary of Assam FA.

History
Assam Football Association was formed in 1946, but the game of football has been played since before independence of India. It is affiliated to the AIFF, Assam council of sports and Assam Olympic Association. Manipur was part of Assam Football Association, until they got the affiliation from AIFF in 1973. The Assam FA conducts inter-district football tournaments of various age groups for men and women as well as divisional football leagues in Assam. Its highest division league is Assam State Premier League.

Assam Football Pyramid
The Assam football structure is based on two state level leagues; the top division Assam State Premier League and second division Assam Club Championship, followed by the district leagues which can go on for many levels. 

AFA organises the following inter district tournaments for various categories:

Men's
 Khirod Baruah Senior Inter-District Football Championship

Women's
 Gobinda Ram Mour and Banarshi Devi Senior Women's Inter-District Football Championship

Youth 
 Santosh Lahkar Junior Inter-District Football Championship (Boys Under-17)
 Satindra Mohan Dev Sub-Junior Inter-District Football Championship (Boys Under-15)

Guwahati Sports Association
The Guwahati Sports Association (GSA) has a four-tier structure of leagues for the Guwahati based clubs of the state.

See also
 Assam football team
 Assam State Premier League
 Bordoloi Trophy
 ATPA Shield
 Bodousa Cup
 Independence Day Cup
 Bodoland Martyrs Gold Cup

References

External links
Assam Football Association at the AIFF

Football governing bodies in India
Football in Assam
1946 establishments in India
Sports organizations established in 1946